Julián Casanova Ruiz was born on 1956 in Valdealgorfa. He is a Spanish historian. He teaches contemporary history at University of Zaragoza, and has been a visiting professor in US, UK and Latin America universities as well as a recurring visiting professor at Hungary's Central European University. He is currently a Distinguished Research Fellow at the Weiser Center for Europe and Eurasia, University of Michigan. He's a columnist for El País and frequent talk show guest at radio station Onda Cero.

In 2008 he was nominated to join the panel of experts in the first judicial investigation (conducted by judge Baltasar Garzón) of the Francoism crimes.

Bibliography
The Spanish Republic and Civil War, Oxford University Press, 2010.
Twentieth-Century Spain: A History, eds. Carlos Gil Andrés and Julian Casanova. (Cambridge University Press, 2014).
 
 Translated as Anarchism, the Republic and Civil War in Spain: 1931–1939 by Andrew Dowling and Graham Pollok in 2005.
 
 
 
 
 
_ (2021) A Short History of the Spanish Civil War, revised edition, Bloomsbury, 2021; España partida en dos. Breve Historia de la guerra civil española, Crítica, 2022.

References

20th-century Spanish historians
Academic staff of the European University Institute
Historians of the Spanish Civil War
People from Bajo Aragón
1956 births
Living people
21st-century Spanish historians
Academic staff of the University of Zaragoza